The following is a list of American football players that have played for the Miami Dolphins.



A

B

C

D

E

F

G

H

I
 Mike Iaquaniello
 Noah Igbinoghene
 Richie Incognito
 Mark Ingram Sr.
 Mark Irvin
 Heath Irwin
 Tim Irwin
 Danny Isidora
 Qadry Ismail
 Rickey Isom
 Larry Izzo

J

K

L

M

N
 Legedu Naanee
 Jamie Nails 
 John Nalbone
 Tony Nathan  
 Ikechuku Ndukwe  
 Ray Nealy 	 
 Joe Nedney
 Nik Needham
 Bob Neff	
 Billy Neighbors 	
 Nate Ness  	
 Ed Newman	  
 Keith Newman 	
 Kendall Newson	 
 Robert Nkemdiche
 Scott Nicolas 
 Rob Ninkovich 
 Troy Nolan	 
 Tom Nomina	  	
 Karl Noonan	
 Rick Norton	
 Don Nottingham	  
 Jeff Novak

O
 Nick O'Leary
 Cliff Odom 
 Jared Odrick  
 John Offerdahl
 Emmanuel Ogbah
 Jeff Ogden   	
 Alfred Oglesby 	  	
 Adewale Ogunleye 	
 Louis Oliver	  	
 Muhammad Oliver 	  	
 Igor Olshansky   	
 Tom Orosz 	  	
 Ralph Ortega 
 Brock Osweiler	  	
 Louis Oubre 	  	
 Greg Ours	
 David Overstreet 
 Chris Owens	  	
 Morris Owens   	
 Rich Owens

P

Q
 Robert Quinn

R

S

T

U
 Jeff Uhlenhake
 Jim Urbanek
 Iheanyi Uwaezuoke

V
 Andrew Van Ginkel
 Kyle Van Noy
 Craig Veasey
 Alterraun Verner
 Olivier Vernon
 Marcus Vick
 Tom Vigorito
 Troy Vincent 
 Rick Volk
 Uwe von Schamann

W

Y
 Billy Yates
 T. J. Yates
 Will Yeatman
 Garo Yepremian
 Steve Young
 Willie Young

Z
 Dave Zawatson
 Rich Zecher
 Zach Zenner
 Jeff Zgonina
 Scott Zolak

External links
 Miami Dolphins All-Time Roster

References

Miami Dolphins
 
players